Taylors Road is a community in the Canadian province of Nova Scotia, located  in Antigonish County.

References
Taylors Road entry in Nova Scotia Geographical Names (Department of Service Nova Scotia & Municipal Relations)

Communities in Antigonish County, Nova Scotia
General Service Areas in Nova Scotia